Crossford is a closed station of the Cairn Valley Light Railway branch, from Dumfries.  It served the rural area of Crossford in Dumfries and Galloway  The line was closed to passengers in 1943.

History 
The CVR was nominally independent, but was in reality controlled by the Glasgow and South Western Railway. The line was closed to passengers on 3 May 1943, during WW2 and to freight on 4 July 1949, and the track lifted in 1953. 1947 is also quoted as a date of complete closure.

The siding was worked by down trains only, goods for Dumfries being taken to the nearest station along. The points were unlocked with an Annett's key that was kept in a locked box on a post adjacent to the point.

Trains were controlled by a 'lock and block' system whereby the trains operated treadles on the single line to interact with the block instruments.

Views at the old station

See also 

 List of closed railway stations in Britain

References

Notes

Sources 
 
 Sanders, Keith and Hodgins, Douglas (1995). British Railways. Past and Present South West Scotland. No. 19. .
 Thomas, David St John & Whitehouse, Patrick (1993). The Romance of Scotlands Railways. Newton Abbot : David St John Thomas. .

Disused railway stations in Dumfries and Galloway
Former Glasgow and South Western Railway stations
Railway stations in Great Britain opened in 1905
Railway stations in Great Britain closed in 1943
1905 establishments in Scotland
1943 disestablishments in Scotland